Orolaelaps is a genus of mites in the family Ascidae.

Species
 Orolaelaps quisqualis de Leon, 1963

References

Ascidae